Antonie van Leeuwenhoek was a Dutch businessman and scientist in the Golden Age of Dutch science and technology.

Leeuwenhoek may also refer to:
 Leeuwenhoek (crater), a lunar impact crater 
 Leeuwenhoek Lecture, a prize lecture of the Royal Society
 Leeuwenhoek Medal, an award of the Royal Netherlands Academy of Arts and Sciences

See also
 Antonie van Leeuwenhoek (journal), a microbiology journal